Kensley Reece (born 26 June 1945) is a former Barbadian cyclist. He competed at the 1968 Summer Olympics and the 1972 Summer Olympics.

References

External links
 

1945 births
Living people
Barbadian male cyclists
Olympic cyclists of Barbados
Cyclists at the 1968 Summer Olympics
Cyclists at the 1972 Summer Olympics